"The Manciple's Tale" is part of Geoffrey Chaucer's The Canterbury Tales. It tends to appear near the end of most manuscripts of the poem, and the prologue to the final tale, "The Parson's Tale", makes it clear it was intended as the penultimate story in the collection. The Manciple, a purchasing agent for a law court, tells a fable about Phoebus Apollo and his pet crow, which is both an etiological myth explaining the crow's black feathers, and a moralistic injunction against gossip.

Prologue 
In the tale's prologue, the Host tries to rouse the drunken Cook to tell a tale, but he is too intoxicated. The Manciple insults the Cook, who falls semi-conscious from his horse, but they are reconciled by the Host and the Manciple offers the Cook another drink to make up.

Plot 

In the main plot of the tale, Phoebus has a crow, which is all white and can speak. Phoebus also has a wife, whom he treasures but keeps shut up in his house. He is very jealous of his wife:

The Manciple digresses to say that one cannot tame a creature to remove its essential nature; no matter how well-fed a tame cat may be, it will still attack mice instinctively. Similarly, Phoebus's wife takes a lover of low estate; the crow reveals their secret, and Phoebus in rage kills his wife. In his grief afterwards, he regrets his act and blames the crow, cursing it with black feathers and an unmelodious voice. The Manciple ends by saying it is best to hold one's tongue, and not to say anything malicious even if it is true.

Source 

The ultimate source for the tale is Ovid's Metamorphoses; adaptations were popular in Chaucer's time,  such as one in John Gower's Confessio Amantis.

References

External links

Read "The Manciple's Prologue and Tale" with interlinear translation
Modern Translation of the Manciple's Tale and Other Resources at eChaucer
"The Manciple's Tale" – a plain-English retelling for non-scholars.

The Canterbury Tales
Poetry based on Metamorphoses